Selkirk may refer to:

People
 Alexander Selkirk, Scottish castaway who formed the basis for the novel Robinson Crusoe by Daniel Defoe 
 Selkirk (surname), surname origin, and list of people with the surname
 Earl of Selkirk, a title in the Peerage of Scotland
 James Douglas-Hamilton, Baron Selkirk of Douglas, Scottish politician and Life Peer, briefly 11th Earl of Selkirk
 Thomas Douglas, 5th Earl of Selkirk, Scottish philanthropist who sponsored immigrant settlements in Canada

Places
 Selkirk Mountains, in British Columbia, Canada, the Idaho panhandle, and far eastern Washington State, United States

Canada 
 Selkirk, Manitoba
 Selkirk (electoral district), a federal riding in Manitoba
 Selkirk (provincial electoral district), in Manitoba
 Selkirk, Ontario
 Fort Selkirk, Yukon

Chile 
 Alejandro Selkirk Island, in the Juan Fernández Archipelago, Valparaíso Region, Chile

Scotland 
 Selkirk, Scottish Borders, Scotland
 Selkirk (Parliament of Scotland constituency)
 Selkirkshire, Scotland

United States 
 Selkirk, Kansas, an unincorporated community
 Selkirk, Missouri, a ghost town
 Selkirk, New York, an unincorporated hamlet in the town of Bethlehem

Animals
 Selkirk (horse), (1988–2013), a North American-bred, thoroughbred racehorse
 Selkirk Rex, a breed of cat which named from Selkirk Mountains

Education
 Selkirk College, a community college in British Columbia
 Selkirk Secondary School, a high school in Kimberley, British Columbia

Sports
 Selkirk F.C., a football club
 Selkirk RFC, a rugby club
 Winnipeg Selkirks, a former ice hockey team from Winnipeg, Canada, see List of ice hockey teams in Manitoba

Transportation
 Selkirk (sternwheeler 1895)
 
 Selkirk hurdle, a freight train route in New York 
 Selkirk locomotive, a type of steam locomotive

Other uses
 Selkirk Communications, a defunct Canadian radio and television broadcasting company
 Selkirk Grace commonly recited before a Burns supper
 Selkirk transmitting station, near Selkirk, Scotland
 The animated movie 7 Sea Pirates, also known as "Selkirk, el verdadero Robinson Crusoe"